The Coat of arms of Lethbridge is an official symbol of the city of Lethbridge, Alberta, Canada. It was designed by Reverend John Stanley Chivers and adopted on September 16, 1907.

The shield is a roundel with three divisions, blue (azure), red (gules) and brown (ochre), with charges depicting a locomotive (for transportation), a sheave of wheat (for agriculture) and a hand with pickaxe (for coal mining) as the foundation of the early economy of the city. A circular scroll reads City of Lethbridge • 1890 • 1906, the town and city incorporation years respectively.

The compartment consists of a panoramic southern Alberta scene portraying strip farming and a mine tipple against a background of mountains and foothills. It rests on the city motto: Ad occasionis januam (Latin for "Gateway to Opportunity").

A mural crown in the crest symbolises the city status and Canada's historical allegiance to the British crown.

Notes

External links
City of Lethbridge

History of Lethbridge
1907 establishments in Alberta